James Thomas Lynn (February 27, 1927December 6, 2010) was an American cabinet officer and government official. He served as the Secretary of Housing and Urban Development from 1973 until 1975 and as the director of the Office of Management and Budget from 1975 until 1977.

Early life
Lynn was born in Cleveland, Ohio, on February 27, 1927, to Frederick Robert Lynn and Dorthea Estelle Lynn (née Petersen). In 1948, he graduated summa cum laude from Western Reserve University (now known as Case Western Reserve University), and in 1951 graduated magna cum laude from Harvard Law School. At Harvard Law School Lynn was the case editor of the Harvard Law Review.

Career

He worked for Jones, Day, Cockley and Reavis, Cleveland's biggest law firm, became a partner in 1960 and was there until 1969, when he was named general counsel for the Department of Commerce. In 1971, he became Under Secretary of Commerce.

President Nixon appointed Lynn to serve as the U.S. Secretary of Housing and Urban Development from February 2, 1973 until February 5, 1975. President Gerald R. Ford appointed him to director of the Office of Management and Budget from February 10, 1975 until January 20, 1977.

Later life 
Lynn joined the board of Aetna in the 1970s and served as its president and chairman in the 1980s. From 1978 to 1983, Lynn was head of the Federal City Council, a group of business, civic, education, and other leaders interested in economic development in Washington, D.C.

Lynn was also general counsel for the Republican National Committee in 1979 and the president of the James S. Brady Presidential Foundation in the early 1980s. In the 1990s, Lynn served on the Board on Science, Technology, and Economic Policy as well as on the boards of Pfizer and TRW.

Lynn was also co-chair of the Business Roundtable, was selected for the President's Commission to Study Capital Budgeting and most recently served on the Committee for a Responsible Federal Budget. Lynn was an honorary trustee of the Brookings Institution.

Personal life
Lynn married the former Joan Miller on June 5, 1954. They had two daughters and one son: Marjorie Wilson, J. Peter Lynn and Sarah Hechler.

He died of a massive stroke at his home in Bethesda, Maryland, on December 6, 2010.

References 

American President. James T. Lynn (1974–1975): Secretary of Housing and Urban Development.  URL accessed on December 28, 2010.
The Political Graveyard.  Index to Politicians: Lynchburg to Lynwood..  URL accessed on November 11, 2005.

|-

1927 births
2010 deaths
20th-century American politicians
Case Western Reserve University alumni
Directors of the Office of Management and Budget
Ford administration cabinet members
Harvard Law School alumni
Nixon administration cabinet members
Politicians from Cleveland
United States Under Secretaries of Commerce
United States Secretaries of Housing and Urban Development